Potua is a genus of Asian groundhoppers in the subfamily Cladonotinae and tribe Xerophyllini, erected by Bolívar in 1887.

Species
The Orthoptera Species File lists:
 Potua coronata Bolívar, 1887 - type species (2 subspecies)
 Potua morbillosa (Walker, 1871)
 Potua sabulosa Hancock, 1915

Note: Potua aptera is a synonym of Deltonotus gibbiceps (Bolívar, 1902)

References

Caelifera genera
Orthoptera of Asia